Samuel Edward Marsden (183215 October 1912) was an Anglican bishop. He was the first Anglican Bishop of Bathurst.

Marsden was born into a clerical family in Sydney, New South Wales: his grandfather was the Rev. Samuel Marsden, formerly senior chaplain at Parramatta. He came to England as a boy and was educated at Trinity College, Cambridge, graduating BA in 1855. Ordained in 1855, his first positions were curacies within the Diocese of Hereford. From 1861 to 1869 he was Vicar of Bengeworth when he was ordained to the episcopate. Widely praised for his "helpful teaching, sympathy and liberal gifts", he resigned his See in 1885.

Returning to England, he lived in Clifton, Bristol and was appointed an Assistant Bishop of Gloucester and Bristol in 1892; by 1900 (after the re-erection of the Diocese of Bristol in 1897), he was Assistant Bishop of both dioceses (of Gloucester and of Bristol). After his death, a memorial was erected to his memory in St. Andrew's Cathedral, Sydney.

References

1832 births
Alumni of Trinity College, Cambridge
Anglican bishops of Bathurst
Australian people of English descent
1912 deaths